TCDD E68000 (stylised as E 68 000 on painted registration numbers) is a series of electric locomotives used by the Turkish State Railways. The locomotives have a power output of 5,000 kW and are capable of 140 km/h (87 mph) speed.

History
The first 8 locomotives were built by Hyundai Rotem in South Korea and the later 72 by TÜLOMSAŞ in Eskişehir, Turkey.

The order has a total cost of $330 million, with 220 million being provided by Islamic Development Bank. These locomotives have a quite simple and unusual livery for TCDD with two flashy yellow stripes on a gray background. The livery of the E68009 is also a bit different from the rest of the series with a big TCDD's corporate logo standing alone on each side. Revised locos have yellow TCDD lettering replaced by blue TCDD Taşımacılık lettering.

Accidents and incidents
Locomotive 68 041 was involved in the Ankara train collision on 13 December 2018.

Notes

References

External links

 Trains of Turkey on E68000

Bo-Bo locomotives
Electric locomotives of Turkey
25 kV AC locomotives
Standard gauge locomotives of Turkey
Railway locomotives introduced in 2013